The Buma Export Award (initially known as Conamus Export Award) was a prize given to the Dutch artists who sold the most records abroad between 1972 and 2011. In 2013, this prize was replaced by the Buma ROCKS! Export Award that focused on rock artists and the Buma Award Internationaal (that has been awarded to the best-selling and most played songs involving Dutch recording artists, songwriters and publishers with international success). The latter award is presented yearly during the Buma Awards ceremony.

Background 

The awards were first presented in 1972. They showed the international prestige and popularity of Dutch singers, producers, musicians or bands. The first winners were pop duo Mouth & MacNeal, conductor Harry van Hoof and songwriter/record producer Hans van Hemert for the success of the hit single "How Do You Do". This song spent 19 weeks on the Billboard Hot 100 and won the R.I.A.A. gold disc on 2 August 1972. Selling over a million copies in the U.S. alone, global sales exceeded two million.
Seven years later, Van Hemert won another Export award thanks to his brainchild: the girl group Luv'
.

Violinist André Rieu holds the record for the most export prizes (seven). Brothers duo Bolland & Bolland and symphonic metal band Within Temptation won the award several years in a row. Jaap Eggermont received the prize twice because of his world-famous Stars on 45 project. Saxophonist Candy Dulfer had three awards. Among other prestigious winners were legendary acts Golden Earring, Focus, George Baker Selection, Pussycat, Earth and Fire and Tiësto.

In 2012 and 2013, the award was not presented. In 2014, it was renamed Buma ROCKS! Export Award and is only awarded to rock musicians.

List of winners

Conamus Export Prize

 1972: Hans van Hemert, Harry van Hoof, Mouth & MacNeal for the song "How Do You Do".
 1973: Focus for their entire repertoire.
 1974: Golden Earring for their entire repertoire.
 1975: The George Baker Selection for the song "Una Paloma Blanca".
 1976: Pussycat for their entire repertoire.
 1977: Champagne for their entire repertoire.
 1978: Pierre Kartner for his alias 'Vader Abraham'.
 1979: Luv', Hans van Hemert, Piet Souer, Pim ter Linde for their entire repertoire.
 1980: Earth and Fire for their entire repertoire.
 1981: Jaap Eggermont and Martin Duiser for the Stars on 45 Medley.
 1982: Jaap Eggermont, Martin Duiser and Tony Sherman  for the Stars on Stevie medley.
 1983: Golden Earring; The Shorts and Jack Jersey (for the song Comment ça va).
 1984: VOF de Kunst for the song ’Susanna’.
 1985: VideoKids; Bolland & Bolland.
 1986: Bolland & Bolland for their entire repertoire.
 1987: Bolland & Bolland for the song In the Army Now performed by Status Quo.
 1988: Bolland & Bolland for the songs Love House and I Wanna Have Some Fun performed by Samantha Fox
 1989: Bolland & Bolland
 1990: Candy Dulfer for the album Saxuality.
 1991: Candy Dulfer for the album Saxuality.
 1992: Ten Sharp for the album Under the Water-Line; Ton van den Bremer for his label ToCo International.
 1993: Candy Dulfer for the album Sax-a-Go-Go.
 1994: Twenty 4 Seven.
 1995: Doop.
 1996: André Rieu for the albums ‘Strauss & Co’ and ‘Wiener Melange’.
 1997: André Rieu and the Johann Strauss Orchestra for the albums “Strauss & Co”, “Stille Nacht”, “Wiener Melange” and “In Concert”.
 1998: André Rieu and the Johann Strauss Orchestra (several albums).
 1999: Vengaboys
 2000: Vengaboys
 2001: Jan Smit
 2002: Marco Borsato
 2003: Within Temptation
 2004: Within Temptation
 2005: Within Temptation

Buma Export Award

 2006: Within Temptation
 2007: Tiësto
 2008: André Rieu, Giorgio Tuinfort
 2009: André Rieu
 2010: André Rieu
 2011: André Rieu

Buma ROCKS! Export Award

 2014: Adje Vandenberg for the creation of the band Vandenberg's MoonKings
 2015: Epica
 2016: Within Temptation
 2017: Textures
 2018: Floor Jansen
 2019: Anneke van Giersbergen

Buma Award Internationaal
Since 2013, this other prize has been awarded to the best-selling and most played songs involving Dutch recording artists, songwriters and publishers with international success. The Buma Award Internationaal is presented yearly during the Buma Awards show.

2013 
 Animals by Martin Garrix  
 This Is Love by Will.i.am with Eva Simons 
 Play Hard by David Guetta with Ne-Yo & Akon
 I Could Be the One by Avicii vs. Nicky Romero
 This Is What It Feels Like by Armin van Buuren met Trevor Guthrie 
2014
 Waves by Mr. Probz
 Red Lights by Tiësto
 Bad by David Guetta & Showtek with Vassy 
 Wasted by Tiësto with Matthew Koma and Calm after the storm by The Common Linnets
2015
 Hey Mama by David Guetta & Afrojack
 Firestone by Kygo
 Reality by Lost Frequencies with Janieck Devy 
 Waiting for Love by Avicii
 What I Did for Love by David Guetta
2016
 This One's for You by David Guetta with Zara Larsson 
 In the Name of Love by Martin Garrix
 Bang My Head by David Guetta with Sia & Fetty Wap
 Catch & Release (Deepend-remix) by Matt Simons 
 What Is Love by Lost Frequencies
2017
 2U by David Guetta & Justin Bieber
 Scared to Be Lonely by Martin Garrix & Dua Lipa 
 Dirty Sexy Money by David Guetta & Afrojack with Charli XCX & French Montana 
 Light My Body Up by David Guetta with Nicki Minaj & Lil Wayne
 So Far Away by Martin Garrix & David Guetta with Jamie Scott & Romy Dya
2018
 X (Equis) by Nicky Jam & J Balvin 
 Jackie Chan by Tiësto & Dzeko with Preme & Post Malone 
 Back to You by Selena Gomez 
 Like I Do by David Guetta, Martin Garrix & Brooks
 Kika by 6ix9ine
2019
 Summer Days by Martin Garrix with Macklemore & Patrick Stump
 Undecided by Chris Brown
 Post Malone by Sam Feldt with Rani
 Arcade by Duncan Laurence
 Say My Name by David Guetta with Bebe Rexha & J Balvin and Tiësto, Ritual by Jonas Blue & Rita Ora
2020
 Futsal Shuffle 2020 by Lil Uzi Vert
 The Business by Tiësto
 Let's Love by David Guetta & Sia
  God Is a Dancer by Tiësto & Mabel
 Coño by Jason Derulo x Puri x Jhorrmountain
2021
 The Business by Tiësto
 BED by Joel Corry, RAYE & David Guetta
 Arcade by Duncan Laurence
 Heartbreak Anthem by Galantis, David Guetta & Little Mix
 We Are The People by Giorgio Tuinfort & Martijn Garritsen
 Wasted Love by Ofenbach ft. Lagique
 The Motto by Tiësto & Ava Max

Most wins

See also 
 Golden Harp
 Zilveren Harp
 List of music awards

References

External links 
 Buma Cultuur
 Archives of Buma Harpen Gala including the winners of the Export Prize
  Encyclopædia of Dutch rock and Pop music at Pop Instituut.nl

Dutch music awards
Awards established in 1972